Próspera is a private city and special economic zone on the island of Roatán in the Central American state of Honduras. The city is an autonomous zone with private government and its own fiscal, regulatory and legal architecture.

Overview 
Próspera is a semi-autonomous city established under Honduran ZEDE laws, inspired by the concept of charter cities and cities such as Hong Kong, Singapore and Dubai. Through low taxes, privatised government and social services and self-regulation the city hopes to drive economic development and innovation that the city argues would not occur under normal government frameworks.

Under the Honduran ZEDE law, Próspera has its own civil law and regulatory structure, independent of that of Honduras. However, ZEDEs remain bound by the Honduran constitution and its criminal law code.

The project is managed by Honduras Próspera Inc. The company is financed by several investors and venture capital firms, including Peter Thiel and Marc Andreessen, through the venture capital company Pronomos Capital. 

Social services such as health and education are planned to be privatized and financed from taxes, fees, and the sale of land to new residents and investors. Individuals may also apply for "e-residency", which will allow them to register businesses in Próspera and benefit from the local tax and regulatory structure.

Residents must sign the city's social contract and pay an annual fee if they want to live in Próspera, which is $260 for Hondurans and $1,300 for foreigners.

As of May 2021, Próspera is 58 acres. It expands over time through land purchases or when Honduran landowners incorporate their property into the Próspera jurisdiction.  The city also has the power to expropriate land from others under certain conditions leading to tensions with neighbours such as the village of Crawfish Rock, who fear their land may be taken.

History 
The foundation for the project as ZEDE (Zone for Employment and Economic Development) was laid in 2011 under President Porfirio Lobo Sosa, but was declared invalid by the Honduran Supreme Court in 2012 because it would violate Honduras' national sovereignty. Subsequently, a modified plan was approved by the Supreme Court after the judges were replaced. American economist Paul Romer was initially involved in the project, but left soon after.

By early 2021, the project was in the starting blocks and the city's first buildings were constructed. German architect Patrik Schumacher is involved in the design of the apartments.

In 2022, Honduran president Xiomara Castro repealed the enabling legislation for the ZEDEs, leaving developments like Prospera in limbo.

Government 
The city is planned to be governed by a council of 9 members, 5 of whom are elected and 4 of whom are appointed by Honduras Próspera Inc.. Decisions are to be made by a two-thirds majority, giving Honduras Próspera Inc. a veto. Above this lies a Committee of best practices, an un-elected body whose members are appointed by the Hondurus government with the power to approve of all internal regulations and provides policy guidance  Although the city will be subject to the criminal justice system of Honduras, it will have its own civil law.

Criticism 
The project is criticized for the lack of transparency in its implementation. Since it is a large-scale project of foreign investors in which national laws are virtually suspended, it is also criticized as imperialistic. The construction and possible expansion of the city is also feared to lead to the expropriation of the local population and human rights violations.

The TUM International, an independent affiliate of Technical University of Munich withdrew from cooperation with the project due to concerns about human rights.

Bibliography 
 Andreas Kemper: Privatstädte: Labore für einen neuen Manchesterkapitalismus. Unrast Verlag, Münster 2022

References 

Bay Islands Department
Roatán
Planned cities
Special economic zones